Integrity is the practice of being honest and showing a consistent and uncompromising adherence to strong moral and ethical principles and values.
In ethics, integrity is regarded as the honesty and truthfulness or accuracy of one's actions. Integrity can stand in opposition to hypocrisy, in that judging with the standards of integrity involves regarding internal consistency as a virtue, and suggests that parties holding within themselves apparently conflicting values should account for the discrepancy or alter their beliefs. The word integrity evolved from the Latin adjective integer, meaning whole or complete. In this context, integrity is the inner sense of "wholeness" deriving from qualities such as honesty and consistency of character.

In ethics 
In ethics, an individual is said to possess the virtue of integrity if the individual's actions are based upon an internally consistent framework of principles. These principles should uniformly adhere to sound logical axioms or postulates. One can describe a person as having ethical integrity to the extent that the individual's actions, beliefs, methods, measures, and principles all derive from a single core group of values. An individual must, therefore, be flexible and willing to adjust these values to maintain consistency when these values are challenged—such as when an expected test result is not congruent with all observed outcomes. Because such flexibility is a form of accountability, it is regarded as a moral responsibility as well as a virtue.

An individual value system provides a framework within which the individual acts in ways that are consistent and expected. Integrity can be seen as the state or condition of having such a framework and acting congruently within the given framework.

One essential aspect of a consistent framework is its avoidance of any unwarranted (arbitrary) exceptions for a particular person or group—especially the person or group that holds the framework.  In law, this principle of universal application requires that even those in positions of official power can be subjected to the same laws as pertain to their fellow citizens.  In personal ethics, this principle requires that one should not act according to any rule that one would not wish to see universally followed.  For example, one should not steal unless one would want to live in a world in which everyone was a thief.  The philosopher Immanuel Kant formally described the principle of universal application in his categorical imperative.

The concept of integrity implies a wholeness, a comprehensive corpus of beliefs often referred to as a worldview. This concept of wholeness emphasizes honesty and authenticity, requiring that one act at all times in accordance with the individual's chosen worldview.

Ethical integrity is not synonymous with the good, as Zuckert and Zuckert show about Ted Bundy:

In politics 
Integrity is important for politicians because they are chosen, appointed, or elected to serve society. To be able to serve, politicians are given power to make, execute, or control policy. They have the power to influence something or someone, which can have important consequences. There is, however, a risk that politicians will not use this power to serve society, which opposes the notion of integrity. Aristotle said that because rulers have power they will be tempted to use it for personal gain.

In the book The Servant of the People, Muel Kaptein describes that integrity should start with politicians knowing what their position entails, because integrity is related to their position. Integrity also demands knowledge and compliance with both the letter and the spirit of the written and unwritten rules. Integrity is also acting consistently not only with what is generally accepted as moral, what others think, but primarily with what is ethical, what politicians should do based on reasonable arguments.

Important virtues of politicians are faithfulness, humility, and accountability. Furthermore, they should be authentic and a role model. Aristotle identified dignity (megalopsuchia, variously translated as proper pride, greatness of soul and magnanimity) as the crown of the virtues, distinguishing it from vanity, temperance, and humility.

In international human rights treaties 
The right to integrity has been included in several human rights treaties, as follows:African [Banjul] Charter on Human and Peoples' Rights (1981), Article 4. Human beings are inviolable. Every human being shall be entitled to respect for his life and the integrity of his person. No one may be arbitrarily deprived of this right.

American Convention on Human Rights (1969), Article 5. Right to Humane Treatment

1. Every person has the right to have his physical, mental, and moral integrity respected.

2. No one shall be subjected to torture or to cruel, inhuman, or degrading punishment or treatment. All persons deprived of their liberty shall be treated with respect for the inherent dignity of the human person.As approved, it includes not only the mental or physical integrity but the integrity of all the human being and all aspects of life.

In psychological/work-selection tests 

The procedures known as "integrity tests" or (more confrontationally) as "honesty tests" aim to identify prospective employees who may hide perceived negative or derogatory aspects of their past, such as a criminal conviction or drug abuse. Identifying unsuitable candidates can save the employer from problems that might otherwise arise during their term of employment. Integrity tests make certain assumptions, specifically:
 that persons who have "low integrity" report more dishonest behaviour
 that persons who have "low integrity" try to find reasons to justify such behaviour
 that persons who have "low integrity" think others more likely to commit crimes—like theft, for example. (Since people seldom sincerely declare to prospective employers their past deviance, the "integrity" testers adopted an indirect approach: letting the work-candidates talk about what they think of the deviance of other people, considered in general, as a written answer demanded by the questions of the "integrity test".)
 that persons who have "low integrity" exhibit impulsive behaviour
 that persons who have "low integrity" tend to think that society should severely punish deviant behaviour (Specifically, "integrity tests" assume that people who have a history of deviance report within such tests that they support harsher measures applied to the deviance exhibited by other people.)

The claim that such tests can detect "fake" answers plays a crucial role in detecting people who have low integrity. Naive respondents really believe this pretense and behave accordingly, reporting some of their past deviance and their thoughts about the deviance of others, fearing that if they do not answer truthfully their untrue answers will reveal their "low integrity". These respondents believe that the more candid they are in their answers, the higher their "integrity score" will be.

In other disciplines 

Disciplines and fields with an interest in integrity include philosophy of action, philosophy of medicine, mathematics, the mind, cognition, consciousness, materials science, structural engineering, and politics. Popular psychology identifies personal integrity, professional integrity, artistic integrity, and intellectual integrity.

For example, a scientific investigation shouldn't determine the outcome in advance of the actual results. As an example of a breach of this principle, Public Health England, a UK Government agency, recently stated that they upheld a line of government policy in advance of the outcome of a study that they had commissioned.

The concept of integrity may also feature in business contexts that go beyond the issues of employee/employer honesty and ethical behavior, notably in marketing or branding contexts. The "integrity" of a brand is regarded by some as a desirable outcome for companies seeking to maintain a consistent, unambiguous position in the mind of their audience. This integrity of brand includes consistent messaging and often includes using a set of graphics standards to maintain visual integrity in marketing communications. Kaptein and Wempe have developed a theory of corporate integrity including criteria for businesses dealing with moral dilemmas.

Another use of the term, "integrity" appears in the work of Michael Jensen and Werner Erhard in their academic paper, "Integrity: A Positive Model that Incorporates the Normative Phenomenon of Morality, Ethics, and Legality". In this paper the authors explore a new model of integrity as the state of being whole and complete, unbroken, unimpaired, sound, and in perfect condition. They posit a new model of integrity that provides access to increased performance for individuals, groups, organizations, and societies. Their model "reveals the causal link between integrity and increased performance, quality of life, and value-creation for all entities, and provides access to that causal link."
According to Muel Kaptein, integrity is not a one-dimensional concept. In his book he presents a multifaceted perspective of integrity. Integrity relates to, for example, compliance to the rules as well as to social expectations, with morality as well as ethics, and with actions as well as attitude.

Electronic signals are said to have integrity when there is no corruption of information between one domain and another, such as from a disk drive to a computer display.   Such integrity is a fundamental principle of information assurance.  Corrupted information is untrustworthy, yet uncorrupted information is of value.

See also 
 Consistency
 Morality
 Ethics
 Doubt
 Honesty
 Bodily integrity
 Data integrity
 Authenticity (philosophy)
 Trikaranasuddhi
 Political hypocrisy

Notes

External links 

 Stanford Encyclopedia of Philosophy entry
 Werner Erhard, New Model of Integrity
 Belyaev, Igor А. (May 2011, Vol. 4, Issue 5) "Human Being: Integrity and Wholeness". Journal of Siberian Federal University. Humanities & Social Sciences, pp. 633–43.
 

Evaluation
Virtue